Xiao Zhen (born December 16, 1976 in Chengdu, Sichuan) is a female Chinese football goalkeeper who competed in the 2004 Summer Olympics.

In 2004, she finished ninth with the Chinese team in the women's tournament. She played both matches.

External links
profile

1976 births
Living people
Chinese women's footballers
Footballers at the 2004 Summer Olympics
Olympic footballers of China
Sportspeople from Chengdu
Footballers from Sichuan
Asian Games medalists in football
Footballers at the 2002 Asian Games
China women's international footballers
Asian Games silver medalists for China
Women's association football goalkeepers
Medalists at the 2002 Asian Games